If Looks Could Kill I'd Watch You Die is the first release by American hardcore punk band Death by Stereo, released in 1999 via Indecision Records. It is highly acclaimed in the hardcore community for its originality and raw sound, tight drumming, lightning fast guitars and tempo changes.  The album is centred on the drums, much more so than their other releases. The introductory track is a sound-bite from the film The Lost Boys, of which the band's name is also derived.

Track listing

Band line-up
 Efrem Schulz - vocals
 Keith Barney - lead guitar, backing vocals
 Jim Miner - rhythm guitar, Backing vocals
 Paul Miner - bass, backing vocals
 Jarrod Alexander - drums, backing vocals

Additional credits
 Backing vocals by Dave Itow, Dave Mandel, Rob Milburn, Brad Doerges, Nick Radeleff, and Death by Stereo
 Produced by Death by Stereo
 Engineered by Paul Miner
 Mastered by Charlie Watts
 Layout and design by Paul Miner
 All songs by Death by Stereo; tracks 3, 5, 6, 7, 8, 9, 11, 12, 13 with Ian Fowles (ex-guitarist who left shortly before recording)
 Recorded at For the Record Studios in Orange County, California

Death by Stereo albums
Indecision Records albums
1999 debut albums